Gornja Bukovica may refer to the following villages:

 Gornja Bukovica (Maglaj), in the municipality of Maglaj, Bosna and Herzegovina
 Bukovica Gornja, in the municipality of Bijeljina, Bosna and Herzegovina
 Gornja Bukovica, Valjevo, in the municipality of Valjevo, Serbia
 , in the municipality of Šavnik, Montenegro

See also
 Donja Bukovica (disambiguation)